Bokolmayo (Boqolmayo in Somali, Bokolmayo English) is one of the 93 districts in the Somali Region of Ethiopia. The district is located in Liben Zone and found in the middle of Filtu, and Dolo Odo, the biggest town of the Liben Zone. Bokolmayo is the district that host the most refugees in Ethiopia -- nearly 200,000. These refugees are Somalis that fled from the civil war in Somalia around early 2009. There are five refugee camps in the Liben zone, three of which are found in Bokolmayo. These refugee camps include: 
 Bokolmayo refugee camp
 Malkadida refugee camp
 Kobe refugee camp
Bokolmayo is located around 90 km to the west of Dolo Odo, and 120 km east of Filtu. The district is in the middle of two rivers: Dawa and Ganale River.

Demographics
The majority of the people living in Bokolmayo are Somalis (99.8%) and the other 0.02% are of other nationalities in Ethiopia, who came for professional work or business. There are nearly 90,000 people in Bokolmayo of which 40% are pastoralists, 20% are agropastoralist, 20% are farmers and 20% are urban dwellers according to Ethiopia's central statistical agency. 

The majority ethnic group is Abrisha subclan of dagodia clan from larger hawiye clan. 

Bokolmayo is the center of culture for dagodia clan and the king of dagodia, Wabar Abdille, resides there.

References 

Districts of Somali Region
Populated places in Liben Zone
Refugee camps in Ethiopia